Michel Loève (January 22, 1907 – February 17, 1979) was a French-American probabilist and mathematical statistician, of Jewish origin. He is known in mathematical statistics and probability theory for the Karhunen–Loève theorem and Karhunen–Loève transform.

Michel Loève was born in Jaffa (then part of the Ottoman Empire) in 1907, to a Jewish family. He passed most of his childhood years in Egypt and received his primary and secondary education there in French schools. Later, after achieving the grades of B.L. in 1931 and A.B. in 1936, he studied mathematics at the Université de Paris under Paul Lévy, and received his Doctorat ès Sciences (Mathématiques) in 1941. In 1936 was employed as actuaire of the University of Lyon.

Because of his Jewish origin, he was arrested during the German occupation of France and sent to Drancy internment camp. One of his books is dedicated "To Line and To the students and teachers of the School in the Camp de Drancy". Having survived the Holocaust, after the liberation he became between 1944 and 1946 chief of research at the Institut Henri Poincaré at Paris University, then until 1948 worked at the University of London.

After one term as a visiting professor at Columbia University he accepted the position of professor of mathematics at Berkeley, in 1955 adding the title professor of statistics.

He is the author of one of the earliest books on measure-theoretic probability theory and one of the best known textbooks.  He is memorialized via the Loève Prize created by his widow Line.

See also
 Kari Karhunen
 Harold Hotelling

References

External links
University of California in Memoriam
Photographs
Photograph from Portraits of Statisticians
 

1907 births
1979 deaths
French statisticians
Probability theorists
University of Paris alumni
Academics of the University of London
Columbia University staff
University of California, Berkeley College of Letters and Science faculty
20th-century French mathematicians
Egyptian emigrants to France
French emigrants to the United States
Emigrants from the Ottoman Empire to Egypt